Land is the solid surface of the Earth that is not covered by water.

Land, lands, The Land, or the Lands may also refer to:

Entertainment and media

Film
Land (1987 film), a British television film by Barry Collins
Land (2018 film), an international drama by Babak Jalali
Land (2021 film), a drama directed by and starring Robin Wright

Music
 Dah (band), a former Yugoslav/Belgian rock band, known as Land during 1975-1976 period
 Land (1975–2002), an album by Patti Smith
 Land (band), an American rock band
Land (Land album), 1995
 Land (worship band), a Scottish Christian band
 Land (The Comsat Angels album), 1983
 Land (Týr album), 2008
 Lands (band), a Japanese rock band

Other media
Land (book), a 2021 non-fiction book by Simon Winchester
Land (magazine), a Swedish weekly magazine
The Land (weekly newspaper)

Places
Land Glacier, a glacier in Marie Byrd Land, Antarctica
Land, Norway, a region and historic petty kingdom in Norway
Land (municipality), a former municipality (1838–1847) in Eastern Norway
The Lands, the common name for Anangu Pitjantjatjara Yankunytjatjara, or APY Lands, in South Australia

Division of a country
 Länder of Austria (singular: Land), the states of Austria
 Länder of Germany, the states of Germany (singular: Land)
Lands of Denmark
Lands of Finland
Lands of Norway
Lands of Sweden

Other uses
-land, a suffix used in the names of several countries and other regions
LAND, a type of denial-of-service attack
Land (economics), a factor of production comprising all naturally occurring resources
Land (surname)
Landing, the end of a flight
Land Tawney, an American conservationist
In rifling, lands are the raised areas between grooves in gun barrels

See also
Land Instruments International, a company specialising in temperature monitoring equipment
Land law